The men's pommel horse event was part of the gymnastics programme at the 1928 Summer Olympics. It was one of seven gymnastics events for men and it was contested for the fourth time after 1896, 1904, and 1924. The competition was held on Wednesday, August 8, 1928. Eighty-eight gymnasts from eleven nations competed, with each nation having a team of 8 gymnasts. The event was won by Hermann Hänggi of Switzerland, the nation's second consecutive (and third overall) victory in the pommel horse. The Swiss nearly repeated their 1924 medal sweep, with 4 of the top 5, but Finland's Heikki Savolainen took bronze between silver medalist Georges Miez and fourth-place finisher Edi Steinemann. It was Finland's first medal in the event.

Background

This was the fourth appearance of the event, which is one of the five apparatus events held every time there were apparatus events at the Summer Olympics (no apparatus events were held in 1900, 1908, 1912, or 1920). Four of the top 10 gymnasts from 1924 returned: fifth-place finisher Giuseppe Paris of Italy, sixth-place finisher Stane Derganc of Yugoslavia, eighth-place finisher August Güttinger of Switzerland, and tenth-place finisher Leon Štukelj of Yugoslavia. The reigning (1926) world champion, Jan Karafiat of Czechoslovakia, did not compete, but the second- and third-place finishers at the world championships, Jan Gajdos and Ladislav Vácha (both also of Czechoslovakia), did.

The Netherlands made its debut in the men's pommel horse. Hungary competed for the first time since 1896. The other nine nations had all competed in 1924. Switzerland and the United States were each making their third appearance, tied for most of any nation.

Competition format

Each gymnast performed a compulsory exercise and a voluntary exercise. The maximum score for each exercise was 30 points. The pommel horse was one of the apparatus used in the individual and team all-around scores.

Schedule

Results

References

 Olympic Report
 sports-reference
 

Pommel horse
Men's 1928
Men's events at the 1928 Summer Olympics